Kogui may refer to:
Kogi people, an indigenous ethnic group in Colombia
Kogi language, a Chibchan language of Colombia